Diemen Zuid (abbreviation: Dmnz) is a railway station is located in Diemen, a city to the southeast of Amsterdam. The railway station is served by Nederlandse Spoorwegen (NS) services as well as line 53 of the Amsterdam Metro.

The station was first used as only a metro station operated by GVB in 1977. This was one of the original metro line's in Amsterdam and is route 53 Centraal Station to Gaasperplas. In 1993, the Nederlandse Spoorwegen railway station opened at Diemen Zuid. This was as part of the Zuidelijke tak (South section) of the Ringspoorbaan in Amsterdam — this is the present-day line between Schiphol and Weesp.

Services

Trains
, the following train services call at this station:
4× per hour local Sprinter service Hoofddorp - Schiphol – Duivendrecht – Almere
4× per hour local Sprinter service Hoofddorp - Schiphol – Duivendrecht - Hilversum - Utrecht

Metros
The station is on the 53 metro line operated by Gemeentelijk Vervoerbedrijf.

Buses
The bus lines are operated by Gemeentelijk Vervoerbedrijf. Line 44 (Monday–Sunday) and 46 (Monday–Saturday) are day services. Line 357 (Friday–Sunday) is a night service.
 Line 44: Station Bijlmer ArenA – Bijlmermeer – Station Diemen Zuid – Diemen Sniep – Station Diemen – Diemen Noord
 Line 46: Buikslotermeerplein – Nieuwendam – A10 – Diemen Sniep – Station Diemen Zuid – Duivendrecht, Station Duivendrecht – Station Bijlmer ArenA – Bullewijk – Holendrecht, AMC Hospital
 Line 357: Centraal Station – Rembrandtplein – Station Diemen – Diemen – Station Diemen Zuid – Ganzenhoef – Kraaiennest – Gaasperplas

See also
 List of railway stations in Amsterdam

References

External links

  Station Diemen Zuid, train schedules and station facilities

Railway stations in North Holland
Railway stations opened in 1977
Railway stations on the Zuidtak Ringspoorbaan
Amsterdam Metro stations
Diemen